"Hold on My Heart" is a song by English rock band Genesis from their 14th studio album, We Can't Dance (1991). The ballad was released as the album's third single on 6 April 1992. The song reached number one on the Canadian RPM Top Singles chart,  the RPM Adult Contemporary chart, and the US Billboard Adult Contemporary chart, as well as number 12 on the Billboard Hot 100. In the band's home country, the song peaked at number 16 on the UK Singles Chart.

Music video
The music video shows the band playing at an empty night club, similar to Collins' 1985 video for "One More Night". To create the visual effect seen in the music video, the music on the recording of the video was played fast and the "singing" was mimed fast. When the music was slowed down to normal speed, the members of the band appear to be moving in slow motion, similar to the video for "Wrapped Around Your Finger" by The Police.

Live performances
The song was played live during The Way We Walk, Calling All Stations (with Ray Wilson on vocals, though rarely played in a low key to accommodate Wilson's voice), and Turn It On Again: The Tour tours. A live version appears on their albums The Way We Walk, Volume One: The Shorts, and Live over Europe 2007, as well as on their DVDs The Way We Walk — Live in Concert and When in Rome 2007.

Track listings
7-inch and cassette single
 "Hold on My Heart"
 "Way of the World"

UK CD single
 "Hold on My Heart"
 "Way of the World"
 "Your Own Special Way" (live)

Australian and Japanese CD single
 "Hold on My Heart"
 "Way of the World"
 "Home by the Sea" (live)
 "Your Own Special Way" (live)

Personnel 
 Tony Banks – keyboards
 Phil Collins – vocals, drum machine, toms, cymbals
 Mike Rutherford – electric guitar, bass guitar

Charts

Weekly charts

Year-end charts

References

External links
 Music Video at VH1 Classic

1990s ballads
1991 songs
1992 singles
Atlantic Records singles
Genesis (band) songs
Pop ballads
Rock ballads
RPM Top Singles number-one singles
Songs written by Mike Rutherford
Songs written by Phil Collins
Songs written by Tony Banks (musician)
Virgin Records singles